Prince Georgy Konstantinovich of Russia (6 May 1903 – 7 November 1938), was the youngest son of Grand Duke Konstantin Konstantinovich of Russia and his wife Grand Duchess Yelizaveta Mavrikiyevna.

Following the Russian Revolution of 1917, he escaped to Sweden in October 1918 with his mother, younger sister Vera Konstantinovna, and niece and nephew aboard the Swedish ship Ångermanland.

Prince Georgy and Princess Vera remained at Pavlovsk Palace throughout the war, the chaotic rule of the Provisional Government, and after the October Revolution. In the fall of 1918, they were permitted by the Bolsheviks to be taken by ship to Sweden (on the Ångermanland, via Tallinn to Helsinki and via Mariehamn to Stockholm), at the invitation of the Swedish queen.

At Stockholm harbor they met prince Gustaf Adolf who took them to the Stockholm royal palace. Yelizaveta Mavrikiyevna, Vera, and Georgy lived for the next two years in Sweden, first in Stockholm then in Saltsjöbaden; but Sweden was too expensive for them so they moved first to Belgium by invitation of King Albert I of Belgium, and then to Germany, settling in Altenburg where they lived thirty years, except for a couple of years in England. Yelizaveta died of cancer on 24 March 1927 in Leipzig.

Georgy, who never married, became a successful interior designer. He died of complications following surgery in New York City at the age of 35.

He is buried next to his sister Princess Vera Konstantinovna at the Russian Orthodox Cemetery of Novo-Diveevo in Nanuet, New York.

Ancestors

Notes

1903 births
1938 deaths
Princes of royal blood (Russia)
Royalty from Saint Petersburg
Russian anti-communists
Russian monarchists
Emigrants from the Russian Empire to Sweden
Emigrants from the Russian Empire to Belgium
Emigrants from the Russian Empire to Germany
White Russian emigrants to the United States
White Russian emigrants to Sweden
White Russian emigrants to Belgium
White Russian emigrants to Germany
Burials at Novo-Diveevo Russian Cemetery